Medapadu railway station (station code:GDPT), is an Indian Railways station in Medapadu, a village in Samarlakota Mandal in East Godavari district of Andhra Pradesh. It is located 15 km towards west from district headquarters Kakinada, 12 km from Samarlakota and 232 km from State Capital Amaravathi. G. Medapadu pincode is 533434. It lies on the Vijayawada–Chennai section and is administered under Vijayawada railway division of South Central Railway zone. 11 trains halt in this station every day. It is the 2140th-busiest station in the country.

History
The southern part of the East Coast State Railway (from Waltair to Vijayawada) was taken over by Madras Railway in 1901.

Classification 
In terms of earnings and outward passengers handled, Medapadu is categorized as a Non-Suburban Grade-6 (NSG-6) railway station. Based on the re–categorization of Indian Railway stations for the period of 2017–18 and 2022–23, an NSG–6 category station earns nearly  crore and handles close to  passengers.

References

External links 

Railway stations in East Godavari district
Vijayawada railway division